Carex molesta is a species of sedge known by the common name troublesome sedge. It is native to eastern and central North America, where it grows in varied wet and dry habitats, performs equally well in full sun and partial shade, including disturbed areas such as roadsides. It is an introduced species and often a weed in California.

External links
Jepson Manual Treatment
USDA Plants Profile
Flora of North America
Illinois Wildflowers

molesta
Flora of the United States
Flora of the Northeastern United States
Flora of the Southeastern United States
Plants described in 1931
Taxa named by Kenneth Kent Mackenzie
Flora without expected TNC conservation status